Henry Owen Mills (23 August 1922 – 1990) is a former professional footballer, who played for Blyth Spartans, Huddersfield Town and Halifax Town. He was born in Blyth, Northumberland.

References

1922 births
1990 deaths
English footballers
People from Blyth, Northumberland
Association football goalkeepers
English Football League players
Blyth Spartans A.F.C. players
Huddersfield Town A.F.C. players
Halifax Town A.F.C. players
Footballers from Northumberland